Excitante (also spelled Exitante) is an Argentine musical & theatre show that acted in the theatre of Mar del Plata and later Villa Carlos Paz. The show was presented and let by the creators Miguel Ángel Cherutti and Nito Artaza, and also led by vedette, Adabel Guerrero and singer Estela Raval. The show debuted in Mar del Plata, Buenos Aires on 2 December 2010, ending in September. The musical's third musical cycle debuted in Villa Carlos Paz, Córdoba in December. It has recently finished its fourth and last cycle in the months of April and May, with the death of its lead woman, Raval, on 6 June 2012 in Buenos Aires.

Cast
The show was formed by Adabel Guerrero, Jésica Cirio, Estefanía Bacca, Cinthia Fernández, Alejandra Maglietti & Virginia Dobrich as well as Luciana Salazar, Carmen Flores, Miguel Ángel Cherutti and Nito Artaza, also Marcos "Bicho" Gómez, Estela Raval with los 5 Latinos and Adrián Kiss the shows lead male dancer and acrobat showman.

Estela Raval

Palma Nicolina Ravallo, better known as Estela Raval, was one of the first Argentine singer of pop latino back to the 1950s. She was accompanied by a band named The 5 Latinos.

Raval was the lead in the musical. In the musical she showed her talented voice, she sang in the theatre show as of the 1st cycle. She was being replaced by Spanish singer and actress Carmen Flores, sister of the late Lola Flores, for the third cycle being that Raval was battling cancer. She later returned to her place as of March. Estela Raval eventually died on 6 June 2012 in Buenos Aires.

Adabel Guerrero 

Adabel Anahí Guerrero Melachenco (born 18 July 1978) better known simply as Adabel Guerrero is an Argentine dancer, actress, supervedette, cabaret star and singer.

Guerrero was the lead 1st vedette in the musical. In the musical she showed her talent in dance including her ability in ballet. She also sang in the theater show as of the 3rd cycle with taped clips of her rise in fame. She also had a live scene on the show in which she performed in the art of acrobatics alongside Adrian Kiss. Adabel has figured in all four cycles from late 2010 to 2012, finishing in the months of April and May.

Jésica Cirio 

Jessica Wanda Judith Cirio Perutich (born 21 March 1982 in Lanús, Buenos Aires Province) is an Argentine model, dancer and vedette of Italian descent.

Cirio was the co-lead 1st vedette in the musical. The revue showed Cirio perform as Guerrero's back-up vedette and the co-lead. She had many dance routines in the musical. Jésica Cirio was in the musical's first cycle in late 2010 to early 2011 as the second vedette and had now returned in the 3rd cycle of the musical as co-lead. She was in all of the musicals cycles except the second.

Estefanía Bacca 

Estefanía Bacca is an Argentine acrobat-dancer, actress and model.

Bacca joined the cast at the start of the second cycle and remained for its third as the second vedette. Estefanía showed her skills in acting, acrobatics and dance, this being the first time she figures in a musical or play rather them being a basic actress or dancer.

Cinthia Fernández 

Cinthia Fernández (born 11 October 1988) is an Argentine acrobat-dancer, actress and model.

Fernández only participated in the second cycle of the risqué show as its third vedette. In the magazine she was capable to show her acrobatic and dance abilities. She later on quit to join Flavio Mendoza on his new cirques revue project, Stravaganza.

Virginia Dobrich 

Virginia Dobrich (Born 8 December 1983) is a Uruguayan professional dancer.

Dobrich was the lead female dancer as well as a vedette in the musical. She had been in all four cycles as the lead dancer and had now also been figured as a vedette in the shows 3rd cycle. She was in all four cycles.

Adrián Kiss 
Adrián Kiss is an Argentine professional theatre dancer & acrobat.

Kiss was the show's showman as well as an acrobatics performer who started as the lead male dancer. Adrián has been in all four cycles and has been figured as lead male dancer for the first two cycles and then as the showman, with the departure of Flavio Mendoza. He had a scene in the revue in which he showed his ability as an acrobat alongside and accompanied by 1st vedettes Adabel Guerrero and Jésica Cirio.  He was in all four cycles.

References

Revues
Variety shows
2010 musicals